John Thurman may refer to:
 John Thurman (Scouter) (1911–1985), British Scouter
 John Thurman (American football) (1900–1976), American football player
 John E. Thurman (1919–1983), member of the California State Assembly
 John R. Thurman (1814–1854), U.S. Representative from New York